Goddess of Love is a 1988 American made-for-television fantasy film directed by Jim Drake and written by Don Segall and Phil Margo. The film premiered on November 20, 1988 on NBC. It stars Vanna White.

Cast

 Vanna White ... Venus
 David Naughton ... Ted Beckman
 David Leisure ... Jimmy
 Amanda Bearse ... Cathy
 Philip Baker Hall ... Detective Charles
 Betsy Palmer 	... Hera
 John Rhys-Davies ... 	Zeus
 Little Richard ... Alphonso
 Ray O'Connor 	... Joe
 Michael Goldfinger ... Mack
 Jennifer Bassey ... Mrs. Wilson
 Marty Davis ... Guard
 David Donham ... Fire Marshal
 James Edgcomb ... Uniformed Policeman
 Lindsey Fields ... Tour Guide

References

External links 
 
 

1988 television films
1988 films
1988 fantasy films
Films based on classical mythology
NBC network original films
Films directed by Jim Drake (director)
1980s English-language films